The Western Kentucky Lady Toppers basketball team represents Western Kentucky University in Bowling Green, Kentucky. The team currently competes in the NCAA Division I as a member of Conference USA. Greg Collins is entering his fourth season as the head coach of the Lady Toppers in 2021–22 after previously serving as the team's associate head coach under Michelle Clark-Heard.

Postseason
Western Kentucky University's women's basketball team has appeared in 32 national postseason tournaments, all since 1984.

NCAA tournament results
The Lady Toppers have appeared in the NCAA tournament 20 times, with a record of 17–20. They were NCAA runners-up in 1992 and made Final Four appearances in 1985 and 1986.

WNIT results
The Lady Toppers have appeared in the Women's National Invitation Tournament (WNIT) 12 times. They made the semifinals of the tournament in 2006 and 2007.

Note: Appearances were in the National Women's Invitational Tournament (NWIT), prior to the start of the WNIT.

Rivalries
Source

Middle Tennessee Blue Raiders

Louisiana Tech Lady Techsters

Louisville Cardinals

Home venue

E. A. Diddle Arena

Players

WNBA draft

Coaches
J. L. Author (1914–16) 1–0 record in 2 seasons as head coach (incomplete records) 
No Team 1916–21 
Josephine Cherry and W.J. Craig (1921–22) 4–0 record in 1 season as co-head coaches 
Edgar Diddle (1922–24) 11–6 record in 2 seasons as head coach 
Jane Culbert (1924–25) 3–6 record in 1 season as head coach 
Nell Robbins (1925–26) 3–6 record in 1 season as head coach 
Elizabeth Dabbs (1926–30) 20–11 record in 4 seasons as head coach (incomplete records) 
No Team (1930–73) 
Pam Dickson (1973–1974) 4–7 record in 1 season as head coach
Dr. Carol Hughes (1974–1976) 22–20 record in 2 seasons as head coach
Julia Yeater (1976–1978) 44–18 in 2 seasons as head coach
Eileen Canty (1978–1982) 50–62 in 4 seasons as head coach
Paul Sanderford (1982–1997) 365–120 in 15 seasons as head coach
Steve Small (1997–2001) 88–40 in 4 seasons as head coach
Shawn Campbell (2001–2002) 14–12 in 1 season as head coach
Marti Whitmore (2002) 2–2 in 1 season as head coach (finished 2002 season after Campbell's departure)
Mary Taylor Cowles (2002–2012) 199–119 in 10 seasons as head coach
Michelle Clark-Heard (2012–2018) 154–48 in 6 seasons as head coach
Greg Collins (2018–present) 49–38 in 3 seasons as head coach

See also
 NCAA Women's Division I tournament bids by school
 Conference USA women's basketball tournament
 List of teams with the most victories in NCAA Division I women's college basketball

References

External links